Pranjal Dahiya (born 5 May 2001) is an Indian singer, dancer and actress in the Haryanvi Music Industry. She became known in 2018. She is currently the highest paid model in the Haryanvi entertainment industry. Her song 52 Gaj Ka Daman is 6th in the 100 most-viewed Indian YouTube videos.

References

External links
 
 Pranjal Dahiya Age, Boyfriend/Husband Name, Height, Family, Birth Place, Net Worth and More

Punjabi-language singers
Indian dancers
Singers from Haryana
1993 births
Living people